Bothwell services is a motorway service station near the small town of Bothwell, Scotland. The service station is located next to the M74 motorway between junctions 4 and 5 and may be accessed in the southbound direction only.  It is owned by Roadchef.

External links 

Bothwell - Motorway Services Online
RoadChef

Motorway service areas in Scotland
RoadChef motorway service stations
Transport in South Lanarkshire
Buildings and structures in South Lanarkshire
Bothwell and Uddingston